Squirrel Bait was an American punk rock band from Louisville, Kentucky active from 1983 to 1987. Squirrel Bait's dense, moody, melodic hardcore sound, featuring pronounced tempo shifts, foreshadowed the grunge sound of the late 1980s as well as math rock. Squirrel Bait, along with Hüsker Dü, are often noted as precursors to the emocore ("emotional hardcore") sound that arose from the D.C. hardcore punk scene with bands like Rites of Spring, Beefeater and Fugazi.

Squirrel Bait signaled the second coming of American punk – bands of little brothers and sisters who got to grow up on Black Flag and Hüsker Dü without a preparatory course in Supertramp. ... Like a hundred other little Düs across the country, Squirrel Bait managed to make a couple of records before spintering off to form five more bands. Unlike most of that punk rock loam, the members of Squirrel Bait chewed up their legacy and shat out something curious and consequential.

History

Origins: 1983–1986 
The band started as a hardcore punk trio of high school friends, originally known as Squirrelbait Youth, with David Grubbs on guitar and vocals, Clark Johnson on bass guitar, and Rich Schuler playing drums for the band's first demo tape in August 1983.  By the time Squirrel Bait recorded their second demo in 1984, Peter Searcy had taken over vocal duties and Britt Walford was playing drums. Three of this demo's songs would later appear on the band's vinyl releases.

Walford left and was replaced by Ben Daughtrey on drums and Brian McMahan joined on second guitar. The band continued to play locally and toured to nearby cities where they opened for Hüsker Dü and Chicago-based bands Naked Raygun and Big Black, who recommended Squirrel Bait to their label, Homestead Records. Through Homestead, Squirrel Bait released an eponymous EP in 1985, a single in 1986 and an LP in 1987, all of which were later compiled onto a single CD.

Breakup: 1987 
In the midst of the young band's success, Grubbs and Johnson had moved away to college, and artistic tensions were causing a "jocks-vs.-nerds" split in the band. These differences ultimately resulted in the band's break-up in 1987.

Post–breakup careers 
Grubbs was subsequently a member of Bitch Magnet, Bastro, Gastr del Sol and The Red Krayola and has released a number of solo projects. Daughtrey played with The Lemonheads and then with Love Jones. McMahan reunited with original Squirrel Bait drummer Britt Walford to form Slint, and Both also appeared on the first single by King Kong. McMahan also formed The For Carnation and played with Palace Music.  Walford would later play in Evergreen and The Breeders (as Shannon Doughton). Johnson played in Bastro with Grubbs but then chose not to make a career in music, opting instead for a career as an attorney in Louisville. Searcy played with Big Wheel and Starbilly before embarking on a solo career.

In 1997, Grubbs reissued Squirrel Bait's vinyl releases on Dexter's Cigar, an imprint of the Drag City label. The band's demo and live recordings have resurfaced on the internet.

Discography

Studio albums 

 Skag Heaven (1987) – Homestead Records

Demos 
 First demo (1983, self-released cassette)
 Second demo (1984, self-released cassette)

EPs 
 Squirrel Bait (1985) – Homestead Records

Singles 
 Kid Dynamite 7" (1986) – Homestead
 Motorola Cloudburst 7" (1987) – The Pope Fanzine

References

External links 
Squirrel Bait on Myspace
[ Allmusic.com review of "Sun God" track from the first EP]

Musical groups from Louisville, Kentucky
Musical groups established in 1983
Musical groups disestablished in 1988
Alternative rock groups from Kentucky
Indie rock musical groups from Kentucky
American post-hardcore musical groups
American punk rock groups
Homestead Records artists
Drag City (record label) artists